Doctor Who: Devils' Planets – The Music of Tristram Cary is a compilation of music by Tristram Cary for the television series Doctor Who. It features all the musical contributions Cary did for Doctor Who except for his music for Marco Polo (which no longer exists) and "The Ballad of the Last Chance Saloon" from The Gunfighters which was left off due to space reasons.  The ballad eventually saw commercial release on the TV soundtrack release of that serial. Due to the folding of the BBC Music label, this album was available only for a limited period and now fetches high prices on auction sites such as eBay.

Track listing
All music composed by Tristram Cary except where noted

Composed by Ron Grainer, realised by Delia Derbyshire (BBC Radiophonic Workshop)
Special Sounds by Brian Hodgson (BBC Radiophonic Workshop)

Album Credits
 Original recordings produced by Tristram Cary
 Stereo Reduction of The Mutants by Tristram Cary, 2002
 Compiled, produced and digitally remastered for compact disc by Mark Ayres

References

Devils' Planets
2003 soundtrack albums